Vadakara State assembly constituency is one of the 140 state legislative assembly constituencies in Kerala state in southern India. It is also one of the 7 state legislative assembly constituencies included in the Vatakara Lok Sabha constituency. As of the 2021 assembly election, the current MLA is K.K Rema of Revolutionary Marxist Party of India.

Local self-governed segments
Vadakara Niyamasabha constituency is composed of the following local self governed segments:

Members of Legislative Assembly 
The following list contains all members of Kerala legislative assembly who have represented the constituency:

Key

Niyamasabha Election 2021

Niyamasabha Election 2016 
There were 1,58,907 registered voters in the constituency for the 2016 election.

Niyamasabha Election 2011 
There were 1,41,564 registered voters in the constituency for the 2011 election.

1952

See also 
 Vatakara
 Kozhikode district
 List of constituencies of the Kerala Legislative Assembly
 2016 Kerala Legislative Assembly election

References 

Assembly constituencies of Kerala

State assembly constituencies in Kozhikode district